P. tabuliformis may refer to:
 Pinus tabuliformis, the Chinese red pine, a pine species native to northern China
 Pitcairnia tabuliformis, a plant species endemic to Mexico